PTI-3 is an indole-3-thiazole based synthetic cannabinoid which has been sold as a designer drug. It was first identified in Hungary in 2020, and was made illegal in Italy in June 2021.

See also 
 PTI-1
 PTI-2

References 

Indoles
Thiazoles
Cannabinoids
Designer drugs
Methoxy compounds
Tertiary amines